Saint Lucia – United States relations are bilateral relations between Saint Lucia and the United States. Linda Swartz Taglialatela is the U.S. Ambassador to St. Lucia.

History 

The United States supports the St. Lucian government's efforts to expand its economic base. The Government of St. Lucia has cooperated with the United States on security concerns. U.S. assistance is primarily channeled through multilateral agencies, such as the World Bank, and the USAID office in Bridgetown, Barbados. The Peace Corps, whose Eastern Caribbean regional headquarters is located in St. Lucia, has 22 volunteers in St. Lucia, working primarily in business development, education, and health. U.S. security assistance programs provide limited training to the paramilitary Special Services Unit and the Coast Guard.  In addition, St. Lucia receives U.S. counter-narcotics assistance and benefits from U.S. military exercises and humanitarian civic action construction projects.

St. Lucia and the United States share interest in combating international crime and narcotics trafficking. St. Lucia is an appealing transit point for traffickers because of its location. The two governments have concluded various bilateral treaties, including a Maritime Law Enforcement Agreement (subsequently amended to include overflight and order-to-land provisions), a mutual legal assistance treaty, and an extradition treaty.

More Americans visit St. Lucia than any other national group. In 2005, tourist visitors totaled over 700,000, mainly from the United States, the United Kingdom, and CARICOM. Cruise ship arrivals in 2005 were down by 18% over 2004, while the number of stay-over visitors increased slightly in the same period.

Embassies
The United States maintains no diplomatic presence in St. Lucia. The Ambassador and Embassy officers are resident in Barbados and frequently travel to St. Lucia. O.P. Garza is the Deputy Chief of Mission. Ian Campbell is the Political/Economic Counselor. Clyde Howard Jr. is the Consul General. Jake Aller is the Regional Labor Attaché and Commercial Affairs Officer. John Roberts is the Public Affairs Officer. Kate Raftery is the Peace Corps Director.

See also 
North American Union
North American Free Trade Agreement
Free Trade Area of the Americas
Third Border Initiative
Caribbean Community
Caribbean Basin Initiative (CBI)
Caribbean Basin Trade Partnership Act
Western Hemisphere Travel Initiative
 Foreign relations of Saint Lucia
 Foreign relations of the United States

References

External links
History of Saint Lucia - U.S. relations
The United States Department of State - Saint Lucia

 
Bilateral relations of the United States